Annituuli Kasurinen (born 27 April 1991) is a Finnish voice actress. She also acted in the film Helmiä ja sikoja.

Roles

Selected films 
 Help! I'm a Fish (2000)
 Emil i Lönneberga – Iida, Emil's sister
 The Powerpuff Girls (2002) – Bubbles
 The Cat Returns (2002) – Haru
 Lilo and Stitch (2002) – Lilo Pelekai
 Peter Pan (2003) – Wendy
 Finding Nemo (2003)
 Helmiä ja sikoja (2003)
 The Incredibles (2004)
 The Chronicles of Narnia: The Lion, the Witch and the Wardrobe (2005) – Susan
 One Hundred and One Dalmatians
 Over the Hedge (2006)
 Happy Feet (2006) – Gloria

Animation 
 Bratz – Yasmin
 W.i.t.c.h.
 Totally Spies! - Alexandra
 Super Robot Monkey Team Hyperforce Go! – Nova
 Kim Possible (2005–2007) – Bonnie Rockwaller
 Lilo & Stitch: The Series (2005–2007) – Lilo
VeggieTales (2005–2007) - Junior Asparagus
 Noddy
 Trollz (2006) – Topaz Trollhopper
 LazyTown - (2006) – Stephanie
 My Little Pony
 Hannah Montana (2007) - Lilly Truscott
 Angry Birds Stella (2014) - Willow
 ''Glitter Force Doki Doki (2014) - Kippie, young Clara

References

See also 
Annituuli Kasurinen at the Internet Movie Database 

Finnish actresses
Finnish voice actresses
1991 births
Living people